Scott Samuel is an American entrepreneur, early internet adopter and investor. He was the founder of  Speakeasy chat system in the 1980s. He founded Honesty.com, served as CEO of Ethical Technologies, LLC, as Chief Community Officer of Andale Inc. and created the popular auction listing tool for eBay. LinkedIn's founder Reid Hoffman credits Samuel's early internet pioneering work in his book The Alliance: Managing Talent in the Networked Age.

Career 
Samuel ran God's Country a Diversi-Dial, or DDial, an online chat server that was popular during the mid-1980s. He ran the service between 1985–87 and 1989–1998.

Samuel originated the idea of internet auction page counters by setting up a prototype on his eBay listings. Users viewed his page and asked if they could use it. He presented it to eBay's board of directors. The number of users for the counter reached 20 within a couple of minutes, 100 within a week, and by late 1998, was being used by 10,000 sellers. He founded Honesty.com to host the auction counters on eBay. Honesty.com grew to 1.1m users from 1999 until it was acquired by Andale Inc. for $35m in 2000. Online Traders Web Alliance (OTWA) was the oldest independent messaging forum in the online-auction industry. Jim and Crystal Wells-Miller founded the site in 1999. In 2000 Honesty.com purchased OTWA.

In 1999 eBay was down for 22 hours due to a system crash. Tens of thousands of angered customers messaged eBay's support board. eBay CEO Meg Whitman responded by closing the boards. In an interview with Fortune, Samuel criticized the decision, "There was a joke going around: 'I guess there are no more problems at eBay' "These are your customers—you don't do that." At the 2004 eBay Live convention Samuel was one of the special guests  to be auctioned off at the eBay Community Celebrity Auction to benefit Disabled Online Users Association (DOUA).

Book Mentions 
Samuel is mentioned in Greg Holden's 2006 book Secrets of the eBay Millionaires. In The Alliance: Managing Talent in the Networked Age, LinkedIn co-founder and former PayPal CEO Reid Hoffman credits Honesty.com's success with adoption of their counters and the techniques that Samuel developed as directly influencing PayPal to use their “Pay with PayPal” feature to encourage sellers to use their service. This same leveraging of users helped PayPal see exceptional growth.

References 

Living people
American chief executives
Year of birth missing (living people)